The Shxw'ow'hamel First Nation or Shxw'ow'hamel Band is a band government of the Sto:lo people located in the Upper Fraser Valley region near Hope, British Columbia, Canada.  They are a member government of the Stó:lō Tribal Council.

References

Sto:lo governments
First Nations governments in the Lower Mainland